The former Diocese of Roskilde was a diocese within the Roman-Catholic Church which was established in Denmark some time before 1022. The diocese was dissolved with the Reformation of Denmark and replaced by the Protestant Diocese of Zealand in 1537. 

Today, the region once within the Diocese of Roskilde's jurisdiction is part of the Roman Catholic Diocese of Copenhagen and is divided between the Church of Denmark's Diocese of Copenhagen and Diocese of Roskilde.

History 
The episcopal see of the Bishop was Roskilde Cathedral but from 1167, when Bishop Absalon completed a new bishop's palace known as Absalon's Castle on the small island of Slotsholmen, he resided at the small town of Havn, which later became the present Danish capital Copenhagen.

The diocese originally included both the island of Zealand and Scania (southern Sweden, then part of Denmark), but Scania was disjoined in 1060 and initially divided into the short-lived Diocese of Dalby and the Diocese of Lund, which absorbed the first and became the Metropolitan of (southern) Scandinavia.

List of bishops of Roskilde 

 c. 1022–1029/30 Gerbrand (da)
 c. 1030–late 1050s Avaco/Aage
 c. 1060–1073/74 William of Roskilde (da)
 1074–1088 Svend Nordmand
 1088–1124 Arnold
 1124–1134 Peder
 1134–1137 Eskild
 1137–1138/39 Ricco/Rike
 1139–1158 Asker/Asser
 1158–1191 Absalon
 1191–1214 
 1214/15–1224/25 Peder Jacobsen
 1225–1249 Niels Stigsen
 1249–1254 Jakob Erlandsen
 1254–1277 Peder Bang
 1278–1280 Stig (uncertainty regarding name)
 1280–1290 Ingvar (uncertainty regarding name)
 1290–1300 Johannes/Johan/Jens Krag
 1301–1320 Oluf
 1321–1330 Johan/Jens Hind
 1330–1344 Johan/Jens Nyborg
 1344–1350 Jacob Poulsen
 1350–1368 Henrik Gertsen
 1368–1395 Niels Jepsen Ulfeldt / Niels Jacobsen Ulfeldt
 1395–1416 Peder Jensen Lodehat
 1416–1431 Jens Andersen Lodehat
 1431–1448 Jens Pedersen Jernskæg
 1449–1461 Oluf Daa
 1461–1485 Oluf Mortensen Baden
 1485–1500 Niels Skave
 1500–1512 Johan Jepsen Ravensberg
 1512–1529 Lage Jørgensen Urne
 1529–1536 Joachim Rønnow

References 

Catholic Church in Denmark
Roskilde